Alexandra Dock railway station was located on the Alexandra Dock Branch, in Liverpool, England. The station served Alexandra Dock until the last train on 31 May 1948. Formal closure followed on 26 February 1949.

History

Opened by the London and North Western Railway, it became part of the London, Midland and Scottish Railway during the Grouping of 1923, passing on to the London Midland Region of British Railways on nationalisation in 1948. It was closed by the British Railways. As was common practice in the 1950s the station was left intact, sufficiently so for enthusiast's specials to call in 1959 and 1964. By 1971 the station had been demolished and its tracks lifted.

The site today

The buildings and terminating tracks have been obliterated by modern development, but the track past the station site still serves Seaforth Dock; there is a loop a short distance northeast of the station site.

References

Sources

External links
 The station and local lines on multiple maps Rail Maps Online
 The station on line SCT2, with mileages Railway Codes
 Images of Alexandra Dock station(s) Google images

Disused railway stations in the Metropolitan Borough of Sefton
Former London and North Western Railway stations
Railway stations in Great Britain opened in 1881
Railway stations in Great Britain closed in 1948
1881 establishments in England